George Christie may refer to:

 George C. Christie (born 1934), American legal scholar
 George Christie (opera manager) (1934–2014), British opera administrator
 Kitch Christie (George Moir Christie, 1940–1998), South African rugby coach
 George Christie, guitarist in the band Fort
George Christie (footballer), see 1951 Scottish League Cup Final